Kyle Coleman (born September 30, 1993) is an American football linebacker and fullback who is currently a free agent. He played college football at Arkansas State and Arkansas–Pine Bluff.

Professional career

Seattle Seahawks
Coleman signed with the Seattle Seahawks as an undrafted free agent on June 2, 2016. On August 29, 2016, he was waived by the Seahawks.

On May 15, 2017, Coleman was re-signed by the Seahawks. He was waived on August 8, 2017.

Los Angeles Chargers
On August 15, 2017, Coleman signed with the Los Angeles Chargers. He was waived on September 2, 2017.

Seattle Seahawks (second stint)
On November 22, 2017, Coleman was signed to the Seattle Seahawks' practice squad, but was released six days later.

Los Angeles Chargers (second stint)
On August 14, 2018, Coleman signed with the Los Angeles Chargers. He was waived on September 1, 2018.

References

External links
Arkansas–Pine Bluff Golden Lions bio

1993 births
Living people
American football fullbacks
Players of American football from Arkansas
Arkansas–Pine Bluff Golden Lions football players
Seattle Seahawks players
Los Angeles Chargers players